We Rose from Your Bed with the Sun in Our Head is the second double and eighth live album by American experimental rock band Swans. Only 1,000 copies of the album were sold, and each was numbered and signed personally by frontman Michael Gira. The album was released to help support the upcoming Swans album, The Seer. Seven bonus tracks, demos to be featured on the upcoming album, The Seer were also released. It was re-released in 2012 as a 2-CD deluxe digipack without the bonus tracks.

Background
The album was sold through the website of Young God Records, with a number of unique purchasing options. The purchasing options included an "executive producer" credit on The Seer, an original drawing by Michael Gira dedicated to the customer, the recording of a short, acoustic song praising the customer by Gira, and a "secret gift".

Track listing
Disc one

Disc two

Bonus tracks

Personnel
Michael Gira - guitar, vocals
Norman Westberg - guitar
Phil Puleo - drums, dulcimer
Thor Harris - drums, percussion, vibes, clarinet, melodica, violin
Christoph Hahn - double lap steel guitar
Christopher Pravdica - bass guitar

References

2012 live albums
Swans (band) live albums
Young God Records live albums
Albums produced by Michael Gira